Andrew Tinari (born September 12, 1995) is an American soccer player who last played for New Mexico United in the USL Championship.

College career 
Tinari was born in West Islip, New York, raised in Holbrook, and graduated from Sachem High School East. He played college soccer at Columbia University between 2013 and 2016, and in the USL Premier Development League with Jersey Express.

Club career

New York Red Bulls II
Tinari signed with United Soccer League side New York Red Bulls II on March 23, 2017. He made his professional debut on March 25, 2017, starting in a 3-3 draw with Pittsburgh Riverhounds. On August 27, 2017 Tinari scored his first goal as a professional and also assisted on another in a 2-2 draw against Ottawa Fury FC. On September 2, 2017, Tinari scored his second goal of the season for New York in a 4-2 victory over Tampa Bay Rowdies.

On March 17, 2018 Tinari scored two goals to help New York to a 2-1 victory over Toronto FC II in the opening match of the season. On March 31, 2018 Tinari scored his third goal of the season and assisted on another in New York's 5-2 victory over Charleston Battery. On June 9, 2018 Tinari helped New York to a 4-2 victory over Charlotte Independence contributing his fourth goal of the season.

Tampa Bay Rowdies 
Tinari signed with the Tampa Bay Rowdies on February 1, 2019.

New Mexico United 
Tinari signed with New Mexico United on February 7, 2020 His contract was not renewed for the 2022 season.

Career statistics

References

External links
 
 
 
 
 
 Andrew Tinari at Columbia University Athletics

1995 births
Living people
American soccer players
Columbia Lions men's soccer players
Jersey Express S.C. players
New York Red Bulls II players
Tampa Bay Rowdies players
New Mexico United players
People from Holbrook, New York
People from West Islip, New York
Soccer players from New York (state)
Sportspeople from Suffolk County, New York
USL Championship players
USL League Two players
Association football defenders
Association football midfielders